is a railway station on the Iiyama Line, East Japan Railway Company (JR East), in Toyono-Kanisawa in the city of Nagano, Nagano Prefecture, Japan.

Lines
Tategahana Station is served by the Iiyama Line, and is 3.9 kilometers from the starting point of the line at Toyono Station.

Station layout
The station consists of one side platform serving a single bi-directional track. The station is unattended.

History
Tategahana Station opened on 8 August 1958.  With the privatization of Japanese National Railways (JNR) on 1 April 1987, the station came under the control of JR East. A new station building was completed in April 2004.

Surrounding area
Chikuma River

See also
 List of railway stations in Japan

References

External links

 JR East station information 

Railway stations in Nagano (city)
Iiyama Line
Railway stations in Japan opened in 1958